Jeremiah J. Park is a bishop of the United Methodist Church. He was elected in 2004, and first served the New York Annual Conference. He began serving the Susquehanna Conference on September 1, 2012.

Birth and family
Jeremiah was born in Jae Chun, Korea on July 4, 1952. He is married and has kids.

Education
He graduated in 1973 from Seoul Methodist Theological School as an honors student, receiving a Bachelor of Divinity. He went on to graduate cum laude from Drew University Theological School receiving a Master of Divinity. He completed his Doctor of Ministry at Drew University Theological School in 1990.

Ordained ministry
In 1979 Bishop C. Dale White ordained him as a deacon of the Northern New Jersey Annual Conference. He was ordained as an Elder in 1981 by Bishop Joseph Hughes Yeakel for the Western New York Annual Conference.

Delegate

Episcopal election

See also
List of bishops of the United Methodist Church

References

Living people
21st-century Methodist ministers
1952 births
United Methodist bishops of the Northeastern Jurisdiction
Drew University alumni
21st-century American clergy